Grace Preparatory Academy (GPA) is a private, college-preparatory Christian school located in Arlington, Texas, United States. Founded in 1992, it offers programs for Kindergarten through Twelfth Grade students drawn from the Dallas/Fort Worth metroplex. It is the founding member of the National Association of University-Model Schools and is accredited by the Southern Association of Colleges and Schools.

History
In the spring of 1992, a group of parents met to share their vision for a new model of education that blended the best of their various public, private, and home-school model experiences. The school was incorporated on December 18, 1992, and held its first day of classes on August 16, 1993. In 2005, the National Association of University Model Schools (NAUMS) — which was founded as the outreach arm of GPA — became a separate entity, and GPA also became accredited with the Southern Association of Colleges and Schools (SACS).

Educational model
GPA was the first to implement the educational model known as the University-Model School (UMS) which combines two elements of educational success, the professional classroom instruction of a teacher and the at-home mentoring of a parent, into a unified, college-like program. Students attend classes on campus two or three days per week, and instruction continues at home on the other days.

Athletics, academic competition and extracurricular
GPA secondary students compete with other non-public schools in athletic and academic events as a member of the 
Texas Association of Private and Parochial Schools. Athletic teams include Baseball, Boys' Basketball, Girls' Basketball, Cross Country, Track & Field, Football, Golf, and Volleyball. Academic teams compete in Academic/Speech, Art, and Music. Extracurricular organizations include: Cheerleading, Journalism, Spanish Club, Fellowship of Christian Athletes, and Robotics Club.

Notable students

Isaiah Austin, former center for the Baylor Bears and honorary pick in the 2014 NBA Draft
Justin Forsett, professional football player for the Denver Broncos
Je'lon Hornbeak, professional basketball player for the Fort Wayne Mad Ants
Emmanuel Mudiay, professional basketball player for the New York Knicks
Jordan Mickey, professional basketball player for the Boston Celtics
Sadiel Rojas, professional basketball player for CB Murcia
Christopher Stoll, freelance artist
Mike Norvell, Florida State University football head coach

References

External links

 Grace Preparatory Academy web site

Arlington, Texas
Christian schools in Texas
Educational institutions established in 1992
High schools in Tarrant County, Texas
Private K-12 schools in Texas
1992 establishments in Texas